William D. Cuts Junior High School is a public middle school located in St. Albert, Alberta. Constructed in 1977, the single story brick structure has over 400 students. It is also home to a vibrant Rec Academy as well as a Hockey Academy.

References

Schools in St. Albert, Alberta
Middle schools in Alberta